Le Châtelet-sur-Sormonne (literally Le Châtelet on Sormonne) is a commune in the Ardennes department in northern France.

Geography
The river Sormonne flows through the commune and crosses the village of Châtelet-sur-Sormonne.

Population

See also
Communes of the Ardennes department

References

Communes of Ardennes (department)
Ardennes communes articles needing translation from French Wikipedia